Decaturville is a town in and the county seat of Decatur County, Tennessee, United States. The population was 867 at the 2010 census. It is named for American Revolutionary War Commodore Stephen Decatur, Jr.

Geography
Decaturville is located at  (35.582983, -88.122021).

Demographics

As of the census of 2000, there were 859 people, 349 households, and 214 families residing in the town. The population density was 511.0 people per square mile (197.4/km2). There were 396 housing units at an average density of 235.6 per square mile (91.0/km2). The racial makeup of the town was 85.91% White, 11.87% African American, 0.12% Native American, 0.12% from other races, and 1.98% from two or more races. Hispanic or Latino of any race were 0.12% of the population.

There were 349 households, out of which 25.8% had children under the age of 18 living with them, 46.7% were married couples living together, 11.7% had a female householder with no husband present, and 38.4% were non-families. 35.8% of all households were made up of individuals, and 17.5% had someone living alone who was 65 years of age or older. The average household size was 2.21 and the average family size was 2.86.

In the town, the population was spread out, with 20.4% under the age of 18, 9.4% from 18 to 24, 22.7% from 25 to 44, 24.8% from 45 to 64, and 22.7% who were 65 years of age or older. The median age was 43 years. For every 100 females, there were 84.7 males. For every 100 females age 18 and over, there were 83.4 males.

The median income for a household in the town was $23,056, and the median income for a family was $37,857. Males had a median income of $30,815 versus $21,103 for females. The per capita income for the town was $14,864. About 17.9% of families and 22.4% of the population were below the poverty line, including 29.0% of those under age 18 and 23.7% of those age 65 or over.

References

External links

Decaturville (Decatur County website)
Town charter

Towns in Decatur County, Tennessee
Towns in Tennessee
County seats in Tennessee